Blue Blood (Italian:Sangue blu) is a 1914 Italian silent drama film directed by Nino Oxilia and starring Francesca Bertini, Amedeo Ciaffi and Anna Cipriani.

Cast
Francesca Bertini as Princess of Monte Cabello  
Amedeo Ciaffi 
Anna Cipriani as Diana  
Angelo Gallina 
Andrea Habay
Fulvia Perini as Contessa Simone de la Croix  
Elvira Radaelli

References

External links

1914 drama films
Italian drama films
1910s Italian-language films
Italian silent feature films
Films directed by Nino Oxilia
Italian black-and-white films
Silent drama films